Grosse Ile Township Schools is a school district in Grosse Ile Township, Michigan.

In 2001, Grosse Ile was ranked the highest out of 88 school districts in Michigan by the Detroit News.

Schools
 Grosse Ile High School
 Grosse Ile Middle School #2
 Meridian Elementary School
 Park Lane Elementary School

Defunct Schools
East River Elementary School - Currently occupied by administrative offices for the school district.
Grosse Ile Middle School #1 - This school was razed and replaced by Grosse Ile Middle School #2.

References

External links
 

School districts in Michigan
Education in Wayne County, Michigan